McLeod (also Sandoun) is a census designated place in eastern Ransom County, North Dakota, United States. An unincorporated community, it was designated as part of the U.S. Census Bureau's Participant Statistical Areas Program on March 31, 2010. It was not counted separately during the 2000 Census, but was included in the 2010 Census, where its population was reported to be 27.

The community lies along North Dakota Highway 27 east of the city of Lisbon, the county seat of Ransom County. Originally named Sandoun for the many sand dunes in the area, it was renamed McLeod for local realtor J. J. McLeod. It has a post office with the ZIP code 58057.

Demographics

Climate
This climatic region is typified by large seasonal temperature differences, with warm to hot (and often humid) summers and cold (sometimes severely cold) winters.  According to the Köppen Climate Classification system, McLeod has a humid continental climate, abbreviated "Dfb" on climate maps.

References

Census-designated places in Ransom County, North Dakota
Census-designated places in North Dakota
Unincorporated communities in North Dakota